Marta Maria Freire da Costa (born 30 October 1956), mostly known as Marta Costa, is a Brazilian administrator and politician. She is member of the Social Democratic Party (PSD) and connected to the Assemblies of God and daughter of pastor José Wellington Bezerra da Costa.

Biography
Born in São Paulo, Marta Costa is married to Luiz Costa Junior, and is daughter of José Wellington Bezerra daCosta and Wanda Freire.

Her family moved from Ceará to try to rebuild their lives in São Paulo, where they became sellers, until her father began dedicating his life to his faith in God.

Costa is graduated in Letters and Company Administration.

She began her public life as City Councillor of São Paulo for three terms, being also substitute of Senator Aloysio Nunes. During her terms as City Councillor, Costa was Chairman of many committees, had many project turned into law, and was the first woman to seat as Vice President of the Municipal Chamber.

She was elect for her first term as State Deputy of São Paulo in the 2014 state elections and reelect in 2018.

On 31 August 2020, Marta Costa was announced as running mate of Andrea Matarazzo (PSD) for the 2020 municipal election as candidate for Vice Mayor.

References

External links
 

1956 births
Living people
People from São Paulo
Members of the Legislative Assembly of São Paulo
Social Democratic Party (Brazil, 2011) politicians
Assemblies of God people